Robert Edward Windsor (born December 19, 1942 in Washington, D.C.) is a former tight end in the National Football League.

Windsor played a total of nine seasons in the NFL, five with the San Francisco 49ers and four with the New England Patriots. He had two productive seasons as a starter with the 49ers in 1969 and 1970, starting all 14 games both seasons and recording 49 receptions (career high) and 597 yards in 1969 and 31 and 363 in 1970. With the Patriots, he became a starter in 1972, started all 14 games and had 33 receptions for 383 yards.

Windsor is best known for a winning touchdown play while with the Patriots that he made in a regular season game in 1974 against the Minnesota Vikings. Both teams had 5-1 records going into the game. The Vikings had been to Super Bowl VIII the season before, while the upstart Patriots were coming off seven consecutive losing seasons and off to their best start since 1966. The Patriots won the game 17-14, and Windsor scored the winning touchdown with no time left on the clock by taking a short pass from Jim Plunkett and breaking several tackles before dragging a tackler into the Vikings end zone who had a hold of his left leg. Windsor severely injured his left knee on the play and was out for the season. He never was the same player after that and played only one more season with the Patriots before retiring.

References

1942 births
Living people
People from Washington, D.C.
American football tight ends
Kentucky Wildcats football players
San Francisco 49ers players
New England Patriots players